is a horizontally scrolling shoot 'em up, the latest console game in the Cho Aniki series. It was published in Japan by GungHo Works on 19 March 2009 for the PlayStation Portable. The game was published in North America by Aksys Games on 25 March 2010 as a digital download exclusive for the PSP, with the full title of Cho Aniki Zero: Muscle Brothers. This makes it the second Cho Aniki title to be released in North America, following the Virtual Console port of the original game.  It is the first Cho Aniki title developed by extreme Co., Ltd., who had obtained the rights of original developers NCS Corp. and Masaya products.  The graphics followed the 3D appearance of the PS2 game.

A limited edition was released in Japan, which includes a soundtrack CD. Also released was a demo that included the first stage of the game.

Gameplay

Fighters
Idaten
Benten
Shoten

Option characters
Adon
Samson
Mika & Eru

Items
Protein: Increases shot power (max 5)
Bomb Bomb Protein: Increases bomb stock

Control
During the Men's beam firing sequence, the player can choose their beam level during countdown.

The cut-in bomb attacks all on-screen enemies, and destroys all enemy bullets.

External links
Cho Aniki Zero Official website for North America
Famitsu Zero Choaniki preview
The most masculine shooting game ever! Free demo of “ZERO: Cho-Aniki” released
2D-X Cho Aniki review

2009 video games
PlayStation Portable games
PlayStation Portable-only games
Single-player video games
Horizontally scrolling shooters
Video games developed in Japan